Museum of Aeronautics and Astronautics,  also known as Air Museum, is an aviation museum located near of Madrid, is situated at Cuatro Vientos Air Base, Spain. The objective of the museum is to acquire, conserve and display the aircraft, equipment and associated paraphernalia that constitute the historical heritage of the Spanish Air and Space Force. It has an exterior exhibition and seven hangars.

History
In 1939 the Spanish Civil War came to an end and the Spanish Air Force was created. It is in this period the Ministry of the Air appointed Colonel Társilo Ugarte Fernández to prepare a project for the creation of an aeronautic museum. However, 27 years passed before its creation. A first draft was presented in December 1948, with its location in the plant below the new building of the Ministry of the Air.

Through subsequent studies and consults, the Museum of Aeronautics and Astronautics was created by decree number 1437 of June 16, 1966, accountable to the Ministry of the Air and with headquarters in Madrid.

Since 1975, the museum has been based at Cuatro Vientos near of Madrid, however the works itself started at the end of 1979.  Thereafter, it has been extended many times. Cuatro Vientos, was inaugurated in 1911 and is Spain's first military airfield. The airfield, although surrounded by construction, is still in use. The museum was officially inaugurated on 24 May 1981, by Lieutenant-General Emiliano Alfaro Jose Arregui.

In 1993, two new hangars were added, and even two more in 2002. Among these hangars, there is number 4, which was inaugurated on 22 August 2003, and which is dedicated to rotating wings and other autogyros, machines whose origins came directly from the spanish engineer Juan De La Cierva.

Museum Displays
There are mainly planes and helicopters, many of which have previously served in the Spanish Air and Space Force. Visitors will also find hundreds of miniature aircraft models, engines, weapons, uniforms, vehicles, mock-ups and many other aviation related objects. Aircraft on display include a Vilanova Acedo, Spanish version of the Blériot XI built in 1911, the Jesús del Gran Poder, a special version of the Breguet 19 used on the transatlantic flight to Asia and America between 1928 and 1929, a few aircraft of the Spanish Republican Air Force, as well as the famous de Havilland Dragon Rapide used by Francisco Franco from the Canary Islands to Tétouan at the start of the military rebellion which began the Spanish Civil War in 1936.

Outdoor exhibition area 
The Spanish versions of the Heinkel He 111 and the Junkers Ju 52, fighters as McDonnell Douglas F-4C Phantom II or Mirage F-1, one Canadair Cl-215, Aerospatiale AS-330 Puma or even a MiG-17.

Hangar expositions 
 Hangar 1: Beginnings of the history of aviation in Spain, aviation during the Rif War, Spanish aviation in the pioneer era and aircraft during Spanish Civil War.
 Hangar 2: Engines, simulators, aeronautical equipment and uniforms.
 Hangar 3: Training planes, fighters of the Spanish war, post-war fighters, gliders and a collection of propellers and engines.
 Hangar 4: Helicopters and autogyros with, among others, two La Cierva, or the Aerotécnica AC-12 and AC-14, and collection of flight instruments.
 Hangar 5: Spanish Air Force aircraft, like the General Franco's de Havilland Dragon Rapide, two versions of the local jet Hispano HA-200.
 Hangar 6: Dedicated mainly to restoration.
 Hangar 7: A collection of more than 100 models on a 1:10 scale

Aircraft exhibits

List of selected aircraft on display

Gallery

Visitors 
 Timetable: Tuesday to Sunday: 10 am to 2 pm. The museum is closed to the public on all Mondays and special days (like public holidays), as well as the entire month of August.
 Visitors must follow the instructions of security personnel and museum staff at all times
 In the case of photographs or filming for personal use, it is not necessary to request any type of authorization.
 Visitors must show their entrance ticket whenever they are requested to do so by security personnel or museum staff, and they must retain said ticket until the end of their visit.
 The museum is a no smoking zone and smoking is prohibited.
 It is forbidden to touch the equipment on display

Ways to get there
There is no access from the airport to the museum, and this is surrounded by a confusing number of roads.
 By bus: It is better to take any of the Madrid-Alcorcón-Móstoles green buses of the BLAS company at Príncipe Pío station. These go along the Autovía A-5 and there is a stop near the museum: ask the driver where to drop off. Busses pass here frequently.
 Nearest metro and commuter rail station: Line 10 (Madrid Metro). Cuatro Vientos Metro station is a bit far from the museum, about 1 kilometre, but there is no marked or paved path to the museum. Walking beside the highly frequented highway is not very pleasant. It is advisable to take a taxi at Cuatro Vientos Metro station to the museum, which is actually part of an airforce base.
 By car: autovía A-5, 10,5 km. Parking is free in front of entrance to the Museum.

See also
 List of aircraft of the Spanish Air and Space Force
 List of aerospace museums

References

Bibliography
 
 Ogden, Bob. (2009). Aviation Museums and Collections of Mainland Europe. Air-Britain (Historians) Ltd

External links 

 Museo del Aire, the official website (2019)
 Asociación Amigos del Museo del Aire, Spanish association (2011) 
 Visit to Museo de Aeronáutica y Astronáutica (2009)
 aviationmuseum.eu: Museo del Aire (2010)

Aerospace museums in Spain
Museums in Madrid
Air force museums
History museums in Spain
Military and war museums in Spain
Technology museums in Spain
Museums established in 1979
Museo de Aeronáutica y Astronáutica
Buildings and structures in Latina District, Madrid